Florica is a commune in Buzău County, Romania.

Florica may also refer to:

Places
Florica, a village in Coșcalia, Căușeni district, Moldova
Florica, a village in Roșiori, Brăila County, Romania
Florica, a village in Ileana, Călărași County, Romania
Florica, a village in Dracea, Teleorman County, Romania

Other
Florica (given name)